The Tide, the Thief & River's End is the second studio album by Australian progressive rock band Caligula's Horse. It was released through Welkin Records on 4 October 2013. The album was recorded by Sam Vallen, Dale Prinsse and Zac Greensill at Heaven's Gate Studios in Brisbane. The album was produced by guitarist Sam Vallen.

Background
In September 2013 it was announced that the band had signed with Welkin Entertainment. Their upcoming sophomore album was reported to be titled The Tide, the Thief & River's End. To coincide with the news the single "Dark Hair Down" premiered along with a music video. The album's progression was chronicled in a series of video diaries that were uploaded to YouTube periodically throughout the recording process between April 2012 and March 2013. Collectively, the videos feature various clips of the band writing, rehearsing, travelling, attending photo shoots and performing live including versions of the songs from "the rough stuff" to the final studio product interspersed with short interviews and interplay between members.

Lyrics and Themes
Vocalists Jim Grey described the album as a "concept [album]…we built the world around". In an interview with Matthew Evans of The AU Review Grey spoke on the general narrative of the album saying that it is "based around two cities" and tells the story "of the journey of a group of people escaping oppression, and seeking a new home free from tyranny." Grey also stated that "the concept and story itself is never explicitly told. There is room for interpretation", in that "the text between the tracks ties it all together".

Track listing
Lyrics and music by Grey and Vallen. Additional music and lyric contributions by Greensill on track 6.

Personnel

Caligula's Horse
 Jim Grey – vocals
 Sam Vallen – guitar
 Zac Greensill – guitar
 Dave Couper – bass
 Geoff Irish – drums
Production
 Sam Vallen – producer, engineering, mixing
 Dale Prinsse – assistant engineer
 Zac Greensill – assistant engineer
 Dave Collins – mastering
 Kelly Meyer – artwork
 Stephanie Bernard – photography

Additional musicians
 Holly Terrens – flute on "Into the White"
 Michelle Wilson – violin on "Water’s Edge"
 Natasha Ivanovic – violin on "Old Cracks in New Earth"
 Stefanie Bernard – clarinet on "Water’s Edge" and "Into the White"
 Sean Thomas – electric piano on "All is Quiet by the Wall"
 Boy Potts, Dario Lagana, Dave Couper, Geoff Irish, John Grey, Lucas Stone, Mitchell Legg, Sam Grey, Sam Vallen, Sean Thomas, Zac Greensill – various backing vocals

References

2013 albums
Caligula's Horse (band) albums
Albums produced by Sam Vallen
Welkin Records albums